Acts 11 is the eleventh chapter of the Acts of the Apostles in the New Testament of the Christian Bible. It records that Saint Peter defends his visit to Cornelius in Caesarea and retells his vision prior to the meeting as well as the pouring of Holy Spirit during the meeting. The book containing this chapter is anonymous but early Christian tradition uniformly affirmed that Luke composed this book as well as the Gospel of Luke.

Text
The original text was written in Koine Greek. This chapter is divided into 30 verses.

Textual witnesses
Some early manuscripts containing the text of this chapter are:
In Greek
 Codex Vaticanus (AD 325–350)
 Codex Sinaiticus (330–360)
 Codex Bezae (~400)
 Codex Alexandrinus (400–440)
 Papyrus 127 (5th century; extant verses 2–5, 30)
 Codex Laudianus (~550)
In Latin
León palimpsest (7th century; extant verses 1–13)

Locations

This chapter mentions the following places:
 Antioch
 Caesarea
 Joppa
 Jerusalem
 Judea
 Tarsus

Ratification in Jerusalem (11:1–18)
Peter emphasizes 'the role of the Spirit, the importance of not 'making a distinction' (verse 12), and the parallel with Pentecost (verse 15)' in relation to Jesus' words (verse 16; cf. ), and warns that 'withholding baptism from the Gentiles would be tantamount to hindering God' (verse 17) because each step in the development of the church is initiated by God.

Verse 17
 [Simon Peter said to the assembly:] “If therefore God gave them the same gift as He gave us when we believed on the Lord Jesus Christ, who was I that I could withstand God?”
The words "them" and "us" emphasize the parallel of the two cases (cf. Acts 11:15), for just as faith existed before the gift of the Spirit in the case of Peter and the Apostles, so in the case of Cornelius and his companions there should exist a degree of faith, otherwise the gift was not manifested in them.

Verse 18
 When they heard these things they became silent; and they glorified God, saying, "Then God has also granted to the Gentiles repentance to life."
This concludes the 'unified and tightly constructed episode of Cornelius' conversion.'

The church in Antioch (11:19–26)

This section extends Acts 8:1 ('those who were scattered', following Stephen's death) as the traveling disciples 'speaking the word'  (verse 19; cf. Acts 8:4) to wide regions (Phoenicia, Cyprus) and then focuses to the development in Antioch in Syria (c.  north of Jerusalem).
and as the one who brings Saul (or Paul) from Tarsus (verses 25–26) to spend a year
quietly engaged in 'teaching'.

Verse 26
 And when he (Barnabas) had found him (Saul or Paul of Tarsus), he brought him to Antioch. So it was that for a whole year they assembled with the church and taught a great many people.
And the disciples were first called Christians in Antioch.
"Christians": This is the first mention of the term "Christian" in the New Testament—followed by second mention by Herod Agrippa II (Acts 26:28) and by Simon Peter in his first epistle (1 Peter 4:16)—where all three usages are considered to reflect a derisive element referring to the followers of Christ who did not acknowledge the emperor of Rome.

Famine relief measures (11:27–30)
The sending of help for the famine in Judea (during the reign of Claudius, 41-54 CE) raises up some historical difficulties:
 The placement of the narrative before the death of Herod Agrippa I (44 CE; cf. ), seems to be in conflict with the date 46—48 CE given by Josephus (Ant. 20.101). However, Acts also records the return of the relief party to Antioch after Herod's death (Acts 12:25).
 It appears to contradict Paul's claim that he visited Jerusalem only once before he attended the council there (Galatians 2:1-10; Acts 15).

See also 

 Related Bible parts: Acts 9, Acts 10, Acts 15

References

Sources

External links
 King James Bible - Wikisource
English Translation with Parallel Latin Vulgate
Online Bible at GospelHall.org (ESV, KJV, Darby, American Standard Version, Bible in Basic English)
Multiple bible versions at Bible Gateway (NKJV, NIV, NRSV etc.)

11